George Daniel Crowe (March 22, 1921 – January 18, 2011) was an American professional baseball player who appeared in 702 games in the major leagues as a first baseman and pinch hitter between  and . Before joining minor league baseball in 1949, Crowe played with the Negro National League's (Rochester) New York Black Yankees in 1947 and 1948, and he also played professional basketball.

Born in Whiteland, Indiana, Crowe graduated from high school in nearby Franklin and Indiana Central College (now the University of Indianapolis), where he was a member of the Class of 1943. He was the first Indiana "Mr. Basketball" and served in the United States Army during World War II.

Baseball career

MLB first baseman
In Major League Baseball, he played for the Boston / Milwaukee Braves (1952–1953; 1955), Cincinnati Redlegs (1956–1958) and St. Louis Cardinals (1959–1961), all of the National League. He hit 31 home runs for Cincinnati in 1957, filling in most of the season for the injured Ted Kluszewski.

He was selected to the 1958 NL All-Star squad but did not play in the July 8 midsummer classic, won by the rival American League 4–3 at Baltimore's Memorial Stadium. The previous season, Cincinnati fans had been involved in a ballot stuffing campaign to put all of the team's regulars in the Senior Circuit's starting lineup for the 1957 Major League Baseball All-Star Game. Ed Bailey, Johnny Temple, Roy McMillan, Don Hoak, Frank Robinson, Gus Bell and Wally Post were voted into the lineup, but Crowe was beaten out in the tally by future Cardinal teammate Stan Musial.

Minor and winter league baseball
Crowe was 28 years old when he moved from the Negro leagues to "Organized Baseball", as it slowly began the process of racial integration in the late 1940s.

He was a prodigious minor league batsman, never hitting below .334 until he was a 40-year-old player-coach in 1961, his final year as an active player. In 1950, Crowe played for the Hartford Chiefs of the Class A Eastern League, where he won the batting title (.353) and led the circuit in hits and runs scored. He twice led the Triple-A American Association in runs batted in, with 119 (1951) and 128 (1954).

Crowe also played winter ball with the Santurce Crabbers of the Puerto Rico Professional Baseball League during the 1954–55 season, where, as a teammate of Willie Mays, Roberto Clemente, Buster Clarkson and Bob Thurman, Crowe formed part of the Escuadron Del Panico (the "Panic Squadron") that led the Crabbers to the league and Caribbean World Series championships.

Left-handed second baseman
Crowe played two-thirds of an inning in one game as a second baseman on June 14, 1958, switching fielding positions with Johnny Temple. Still wearing his over-sized first baseman's mitt—Crowe threw left-handed and playing any infield position other than first base is rare for a southpaw—he completed a double play against the batter, pitcher John Briggs of the Chicago Cubs. Although the Cubs won the contest, 4–3, Chicago skipper Bob Scheffing played the game under protest because Crowe had used a non-standard infielder's glove. Scheffing's protest led to a rule change mandating that first basemen moving to a different defensive position must exchange their mitt for a regulation fielder's glove.

MLB totals and milestones
In 702 games over nine MLB seasons, Crowe posted a .270 batting average (467-for-1,727) with 215 runs, 70 doubles, 12 triples, 81 home runs and 299 RBI. He recorded a .990 fielding percentage as a first baseman. Crowe set a record (later broken by Jerry Lynch and subsequently by Cliff Johnson) for most pinch-hit home runs in major league baseball history with 14.

Basketball career

Crowe played basketball for the barnstorming New York Renaissance Big Five (aka "Rens").  In 1947 Crowe played basketball for the integrated Los Angeles Red Devils, a team that also included future Brooklyn Dodgers' star Jackie Robinson.

Crowe played professional basketball in the National Basketball League (NBL) and the American Basketball League (ABL). He first played for the Dayton Rens of the NBL during the 1948–49 season and averaged 10.9 points per game. Crowe moved to the New York Harlem Yankees of the ABL during the 1949–50 season and averaged 13.6 points per game. He returned to the Yankees as they were renamed to the Glens Falls-Saratoga for the 1952–53 season and he averaged 12.3 points per game. Crowe briefly served as the team's head coach during the season and recorded three losses.

Family
He was the younger brother of Ray Crowe, who was the head basketball coach of the Crispus Attucks High School teams that won two consecutive Indiana state titles in 1954–55 and 1955–56, led by Oscar Robertson.

References

External links
 and Seamheads

Corbett, Warren, George Crowe Society for American Baseball Research Biography Project
Indiana Basketball Hall of Fame profile

1921 births
2011 deaths
21st-century African-American people
African Americans in World War II
African-American basketball players
American Basketball League (1925–1955) players
American men's basketball players
Baseball players from Indiana
Basketball players from Indiana
Boston Braves players
Centers (basketball)
Charleston Marlins players
Cincinnati Redlegs players
Dayton Rens players
Forwards (basketball)
Hartford Chiefs players
Indianapolis Greyhounds baseball players
Indianapolis Greyhounds men's basketball players
Major League Baseball first basemen
Milwaukee Braves players
Milwaukee Brewers (minor league) players
National League All-Stars
New York Black Yankees players
Pawtucket Slaters players
People from Franklin, Indiana
St. Louis Cardinals players
St. Louis Cardinals scouts
San Juan Marlins players
Toledo Sox players
United States Army personnel of World War II
African-American United States Army personnel
20th-century African-American sportspeople